A maltoside is a glycoside with maltose as the glycone (sugar) functional group. Among the most common are alkyl maltosides, which contain hydrophobic alkyl chains as the aglycone. Given their amphoteric properties, these comprise a class of detergents, where variation in the alkyl chain confers a range of detergent properties including CMC and solubility. Maltosides are most often used for the solubilization and purification of membrane proteins.

History 
In 1980 Ferguson-Miller et al. at Michigan State developed n-dodecyl-β-D-maltopyranoside (DDM) as part of a successful effort to purify an active, stable, monodisperse form of cytochrome c oxidase.  Maltosides have been used extensively to stabilize membrane proteins for biophysical and structural studies.

Table of detergent properties

References

Disaccharides
Reagents for biochemistry
Non-ionic surfactants